Jan Zachwatowicz (4 March 1900 – 18 August 1983) was a Polish architect, architectural historian, and restorer.

Biography 
Zachwatowicz was born in Gatchina. He studied Industrial Civil Engineering at the Saint Petersburg Polytechnical University, and graduated from the School of Architecture at the Warsaw University of Technology in 1930. He was awarded with the SARP Honorary Award (1971).

He was a professor of the Warsaw University of Technology (since 1946; he worked there since 1925), member of the Polish Academy of Sciences (since 1952), member of the Académie d'architecture in Paris (since 1967), member of the International Council on Monuments and Sites, general restorer of relics in Poland (from 1945 to 1957), chairman of the Architectural-Restoration Committee (since 1971), and chairman of the Civil Committee of Royal Castle in Warsaw Reconstruction.

Zachwatowicz contributed to reorganization and enlargement of Polish restoration service. During the occupation of Poland (1939–1945) he took a part of teaching, protecting and saving works, i.e. set of relic buildings measurements (including The Market Square of Warsaw Old Town). From January 1945 he co-directed the Warsaw Reconstruction Office (f. Biuro Organizacji Odbudowy Warszawy).

After World War II, many other historic buildings in Gdańsk, Poznań, and Wrocław were restored or rebuilt according to principles established by Zachwatowicz and his team. Among his many achievements was the rebuilding of St. John's Cathedral, Warsaw (1960).

He was a scholar with over 200 major publications to his credit.

He was the father of Krystyna and Katarzyna Zachwatowicz.  He died in Warsaw, aged 83.

Selected works
 Ochrona Zabytków w Polsce (1965)
 Architektura polska (1966)
 Sztuka polska przedromańska i romańska do schyłku XIII wieku (1971; collective work)
 Zamek Królewski w Warszawie (1972)

References
Inline

General

External links 
 Testimony of Jan Zachwatowicz about German policy in occupied Warsaw - Chronicles of Terror collection

1900 births
1983 deaths
Architectural historians
Warsaw University of Technology alumni
Saint-Petersburg State University of Architecture and Civil Engineering alumni
Academic staff of the Warsaw University of Technology
Recipients of the Order of Polonia Restituta (1944–1989)
20th-century Polish historians
20th-century Polish architects
Recipients of the State Award Badge (Poland)
People from Tsarskoselsky Uyezd
Burials at Powązki Cemetery